The 2009 Southern Miss Golden Eagles football team represented The University of Southern Mississippi in the 2009 NCAA Division I FBS football season. The team's head coach was Larry Fedora, who was in his second year at Southern Miss. They played their home games at M. M. Roberts Stadium in Hattiesburg, Mississippi and competed in the East Division of Conference USA.

The Golden Eagles finished the season with a record of 7–6, 5–3 in C-USA play and lost to Middle Tennessee, 42–32, in the New Orleans Bowl.

Schedule

Game Summaries

Alcorn State

The Golden Eagles and Braves met for the first time in each schools' history.  Southern Miss set an attendance record of 36,232.

UCF

Virginia

Kansas

UAB

Louisville

Memphis

Tulane

Houston

Marshall

Tulsa

East Carolina

Middle Tennessee – New Orleans Bowl

References

Southern Miss
Southern Miss Golden Eagles football seasons
Southern Miss Golden Eagles football